Bayu is a former Maidu settlement in Butte County, California, United States. It was located near Powers on the Feather River.

References

Former settlements in Butte County, California
Former Native American populated places in California
Maidu villages